Anton Fischer is a West German bobsledder who competed in the 1980s. He was the first ever winner of the Bobsleigh World Cup in 1984-5 and was unofficial winner of the two-man bobsleigh event both in that same year and in 1986-7.

Fischer also competed in two Winter Olympics, earning his best finish of seventh in the two-man event at Calgary in 1988.

References

External links
1984 four-man bobsleigh results
1984 two-man bobsleigh results
1988 four-man bobsleigh results
1988 two-man bobsleigh results
List of combined men's bobsleigh World Cup champions: 1985-2007
List of two-man bobsleigh World Cup champions since 1985

Living people
German male bobsledders
Bobsledders at the 1984 Winter Olympics
Bobsledders at the 1988 Winter Olympics
Year of birth missing (living people)
Olympic bobsledders of West Germany
20th-century German people